Saxicolella is a genus of plant in family Podostemaceae.

Species include:
 Saxicolella marginalis (G. Taylor) M. Cheek
 Saxicolella deniseae

Etymology
Saxicolella comes from the Latin "saxum", meaning "a rock" or "stone", and "-cola", meaning "inhabitant" or "resident".

References

Podostemaceae
Malpighiales genera
Taxonomy articles created by Polbot